Barbora Dvořáková (born November 15, 1995) is a Czech ice hockey player for SK Karviná and the Czech national team.

She participated at the 2016 IIHF Women's World Championship.

References

External links

1995 births
Living people
Czech women's ice hockey goaltenders
Sportspeople from Ostrava